In S. City is a 1966 Soviet drama film directed by Iosif Kheifits. Film adaptation of Anton Chekhov's short story Ionych.

Plot 
The film tells about a young and dreamy doctor who moves to city S., where he becomes extremely bored.

Cast 
 Andrei Popov as Anton Pavlovich Chekhov
 Anatoli Papanov as Dmitry Ionovich Startsev
 Nonna Terentyeva as Yekaterina Ivanovna Turkina
 Lidiya Shtykan as Vera Iosifovna Turkina
 Igor Gorbachyov as Turkin
 Aleksey Batalov as Shergov  
 Aleksandr Borisov as Puzyryov 
 Grigory Shpigel as lawyer Losev
 Olga Aroseva as Maria Pavlovna Chekhova
 Leonid Bykov as carter
 Rina Zelyonaya as writer
 Ivan Krasko as writer
 Iya Savvina as lady with a dog
 Nikolai Sergeyev as ill man
 Aleksei Smirnov as man with a pineapple
 Roman Tkachuk as Volsky

References

External links 
 

1966 films
1960s Russian-language films
Soviet drama films
1966 drama films
Films based on works by Anton Chekhov
Films directed by Iosif Kheifits
Lenfilm films